The 2004 Peach Bowl featured the Florida Gators and the Miami Hurricanes.

Miami took a 7–0 lead when it blocked a Florida field goal attempt, and Devin Hester returned the ball 78 yards for a touchdown. In the second quarter, Matt Leach kicked a 34-yard field goal to make it 10–3. Roscoe Parrish scored on a 72-yard punt return, giving Miami a 17–3 lead at halftime, even though it didn't score an offensive touchdown.

In the third quarter, Brock Berlin threw a 20-yard touchdown pass to Ryan Moore, and the Hurricanes led 24–3. Florida's Chris Leak threw a 45-yard touchdown pass to Jemalle Cornelius as the Gators got within 24–10.  A 32-yard field goal from Miami gave the Hurricanes the 27–10 win.

See also
 Florida–Miami football rivalry

References

Peach Bowl
Peach Bowl
Florida Gators football bowl games
Miami Hurricanes football bowl games
December 2004 sports events in the United States
Peach
2004 in Atlanta